Amir Hamza may refer to:

 Amir Hamza (cricketer) (born 1991), Afghan cricketer
 Amir Hamza (poet), Bangladeshi poet
 Hamza ibn Abd al-Muttalib, the prophet Mohammed's uncle
 Amir Hamza (Lashkar-e-Taiba), a leader of the group Lashkar-e-Taiba
 Amir Hamza (Nuristan), a delegate to Afghanistan's Constitutional Loya Jirga
 Amir Hamza I, utsmi of Kaitags in 1595-1608/9
 Amir Hamza II, utsmi of Kaitags in 1696-1706
 Amir Hamza III, utsmi of Kaitags in 1751-1787

See also
 Ameer Hamza (born 1995), Pakistani cricketer
 Ameer Hamza Shinwari (1907–1994), Pashto-language poet